Zhuzhou CRRC Times Electric Co. Ltd., abbreviated as TEC, is a Chinese train manufacturer. It is headquartered in Zhuzhou, Hunan Province. The company is a prominent maker of traction systems for locomotives, electric multiple units and urban transit train applications, which generates  of the company's total sales.

Despite both CRRC Times Electric and intermediate parent company CRRC were listed companies, the ultimate largest shareholder was the Central Government of China, via SASAC and CRRC Group.

Since 5 September 2016 CRRC Times Electric is a constituent of Hang Seng China Enterprises Index.

History

Predecessors
The parent company of the predecessors and current direct parent entity of Zhuzhou CRRC Times Electric, Zhuzhou Electric Locomotive Research Institute, was found in 1959 by the Ministry of Railways. CRRC ZELRI; subsidiary of listed company CRRC).

In 2002, Zhuzhou Electric Locomotive Research Institute was 51% owned by CSR Group and CNR Group, the duopoly of the Chinese market. The ratio was set immediately after the controls of the duopoly were transferred from the Ministry of Railways to State-owned Assets Supervision and Administration Commission (SASAC). Both SASAC and the ministry were entities of the State Council of the People's Republic of China.

The institute had founded Zhuzhou Times Electronic Technology Co., Ltd. ("Times Electronic" for short) on 28 December 1992, which became a subsidiary of Zhuzhou CSR Times Electric in 2005, for 90% share capital. Another subsidiary of the institute, "Zhuzhou Electric Locomotive Research Institute, Ningbo Branch", was found on 4 February 1992. The Ningbo Branch became a wholly owned subsidiary of Zhuzhou CSR Times Electric also in 2005.

Zhuzhou CRRC Times Electric
On 26 September 2005 Zhuzhou CSR Times Electric Co., Ltd. was incorporated as "company limited by shares" (function similar to public limited company), CSR Group injected Times Electronic, CSR Zhuzhou Institute Ningbo Branch and other assets into the company as share capital. On 20 June 2006 the Ningbo company was re-incorporated as a limited company as Ningbo CSR Times Sensor Technology Co., Ltd. (now known as Ningbo CRRC Times Transducer Technology Co., Ltd., previously incorporated under the Law on Industrial Enterprises Owned by the Whole People in 1992)

In December 2006, Zhuzhou CSR Times Electric was listed on the Hong Kong Stock Exchange, a year before the listing of the intermediate parent company CSR Corp., Ltd.

Followed by the merger of ultimate parent company CSR Group with CNR Group to form CRRC Group (as well as their listed subsidiaries CSR Corp. Ltd. and China CNR Corp., Ltd. to form CRRC Corp., Ltd.) in 2015, Zhuzhou CSR Times Electric was renamed to Zhuzhou CRRC Times Electric on 10 March 2016. The company remained as a separate listed company without privatization nor merger by share swap.

Joint venture
Siemens Traction Equipment Ltd. (STEZ), is a joint venture between Siemens (50%), Zhuzhou CRRC Times Electric (30%) and CRRC Zhuzhou Locomotive (20%). It produces AC drive electric locomotives and AC locomotive traction components.

Shareholders

The share capital of the company consisted of domestic share (A share) and share floats outside mainland China (H share).

As of 13 January 2017, 53.44% shares were A shares, which were owned by subsidiaries of CRRC (mainly CRRC Zhuzhou Institute), subsidiary of Sinomach (Sinomach Capital Holdings Co., Ltd.) and CRCC High-tech Equipment, all were indirect subsidiaries of the Chinese Government (via SASAC). Moreover, CRRC Zhuzhou Institute also owned 2.91% shares of CRCC High-tech Equipment as minority shareholder.

As of 31 December 2016, the major shareholders of H shares (>5% H shares) were investment managers Schroders, Bank of America Merrill Lynch, Fidelity International and sovereign wealth fund of Singapore (GIC Private Limited).

References

External links
 

Companies formerly in the Hang Seng China Enterprises Index
Companies listed on the Hong Kong Stock Exchange
Chinese companies established in 1992
Chinese companies established in 2005
Manufacturing companies established in 2005
Times Electric
Government-owned companies of China
Manufacturing companies based in Hunan
Electronics companies of China
Zhuzhou